Entrapment is a 1999 caper film directed by Jon Amiel and written by Ronald Bass. It stars Sean Connery and Catherine Zeta-Jones and includes Will Patton, Ving Rhames and Maury Chaykin. The film focuses on the relationship between investigator Virginia "Gin" Baker and professional thief Robert "Mac" MacDougal as they attempt a heist at the turn of the New Millennium. Simon West and Antoine Fuqua were both in talks to direct before Amiel was hired.

The film was released theatrically in the United States on 30 April 1999 and in the United Kingdom on 2 July 1999.

Plot
Virginia "Gin" Baker (Catherine Zeta-Jones) is an investigator for "Waverly Insurance". Robert "Mac" MacDougal (Sean Connery) is a professional thief who specialises in international art. A priceless Rembrandt painting is stolen from an office building in New York one night, and Gin is sent undercover to investigate Mac as the chief suspect. She tries to entrap him with a proposition, claiming that she is a professional thief herself, and promises that she will help him steal a priceless Chinese mask from the well-guarded Bedford Palace. Before agreeing, Mac tells Gin his "Rule Number One": "Never carry a gun: You carry a gun, you may be tempted to use it." They travel to Scotland and plan the very complicated theft at Mac's hideout, an isolated castle. Aaron Thibadeaux (Ving Rhames), apparently the only ally that Mac trusts, arrives with supplies for the heist. While Mac is busy making final preparations, Gin contacts her boss, Hector Cruz (Will Patton), from a payphone, and informs him of Mac's whereabouts. Little does she know that the whole island is bugged, allowing Mac to eavesdrop on their conversation.  Mac also makes sure to keep Gin's romantic advances at bay, unsure if she is a true partner in crime or an ambitious career woman on a mission.

After they have stolen the mask, Mac accuses Gin of planning to sell the mask to a buyer in Kuala Lumpur and then turn him in. Gin convinces him that her insurance agency job is the real cover and that she has planned an even bigger heist in Kuala Lumpur: $8 billion from the "International Clearance Bank" (which refers to the Bank of International Settlements in Malaysia) in the North Tower of the Petronas Towers. During their set-up, Cruz and his team (with the guidance of the stealthy Thibadeaux) track down Gin and confirm that she is still on mission to bring in Mac.

Despite the presence of Cruz and other security watching the building, the theft takes place in the final seconds of the new 2000 millennium countdown. Gin pulls the plug on her laptop prematurely and sets off alarms. They narrowly escape from the computer vault and are forced to cross the lights hung from the bottom of the bridge linking the two towers. Following a death-defying moment when the cable breaks, Gin and Mac make their way to a ventilation shaft, where Mac explains "Plan B". Using mini-parachutes, they were going to escape down the shaft. Gin had lost her parachute earlier in the escape, so Mac gives her his. He tells her to meet him the next morning at Pudu train station.

Gin arrives at the station waiting for Mac. He shows up late with Aaron Thibadeaux, who reveals himself with fellow FBI agents. He explains that Cruz is here and that the FBI has been looking for her for some time. Two years earlier, when Agent Thibadeaux caught and arrested him, Mac made a deal to help the FBI arrest Gin, as she was the primary target all along. However, the ageing thief has another plan: to help her escape. Mac slips Gin a gun, new passport and travel documents and quietly explains that he returned only seven of the eight billion dollars they had stolen electronically in the heist. Gin then pretends to hold Mac hostage at gunpoint, threatening to shoot him if the agents follow her. She boards a train and the FBI heads to the next station. Gin jumps trains mid-station and arrives back at Pudu. She tells Mac that she needs him for another job and they both board a train.

Cast
 Sean Connery as Robert "Mac" MacDougal
 Catherine Zeta-Jones as Virginia "Gin" Baker
 Will Patton as Hector Cruz
 Ving Rhames as FBI Agent Aaron Thibadeaux
 Maury Chaykin as Conrad Greene
 Kevin McNally as Haas
 Terry O'Neill as Quinn
 Madhav Sharma as Security Chief
 David Yip as Chief of Police
 Tim Potter as "Millennium Man"
 Rolf Saxon as Director
 Maya Karin (Cameo)

Filming locations

Principal Photography took place from June 29 to October 1998. Filming locations for the film include Blenheim Palace, Savoy Hotel London, Lloyd's of London, Borough Market, London, Duart Castle on the Isle of Mull in Scotland, the Petronas Towers in Kuala Lumpur (with other filming completed at Pinewood Studios) and the Bukit Jalil LRT station. However, the signage at this station that was used for the movie was Pudu LRT station instead of Bukit Jalil.

Music
The film's score was composed by Christopher Young.

British singer-songwriter Seal performs "Lost My Faith" over the end credits. The music video features Seal performing a heist in a tall building, where he steals a talisman but sets off the alarm. As the police storm the building, Seal ultimately escapes by jumping through a window. At first, he appears to be free-falling, but a descender he is attached to (the same one Gin uses in the film) stops him before he reaches the ground. Seal unclips himself and walks away. The music video contains clips from the film, including Sean Connery and Catherine Zeta-Jones as Seal's accomplices.

Reception
The film was a box office success, grossing over $87 million in the US and $212 million worldwide.

According to the review aggregator website Rotten Tomatoes, 40% of critics have given the film a positive review based on 85 reviews, with an average rating of 5.2/10. The site's critics consensus reads, "A poorly developed plot weighs down any potential chemistry between the movie's leads." At Metacritic, the film has a weighted average score of 54 out of 100 based on 24 critics, indicating "mixed or average reviews".

Critics such as The New York Times, New York Magazine, the Chicago Sun-Times, Variety and Desson Howe/Thomson of The Washington Post praised the film.

Roger Ebert gave the film three of four stars. "It works because it is made stylishly. The plot is put together like a Swiss watch that keeps changing time zones: It is accurate and misleading at once. The film consists of one elaborate caper sequence after another, and it rivals the Bond films in its climactic action sequence. The stunt and f/x work here does a good job... Most of the movie's action is just that—action—and not extreme violence." Ebert noted about Zeta-Jones, "I can only reflect, as I did while watching her in "The Mask Of Zorro," that while beautiful women are a dime a dozen in the movies, those with fire, flash and humor are a good deal more scarce."

"There's a tummy-churning tradition of pensionable movie blokes getting paired up with beautiful babes..." complained OK! in its review. "We barely believed Sean and Michelle Pfeiffer in The Russia House; a decade later, Sean and Catherine Zeta-Jones? You gotta be kidding. The film's alright-ish."

Responses from the Malaysian government
Following Entrapment release in June 1999, the Malaysian Prime Minister Mahathir Mohamad accused the film of presenting a distorted image of Malaysia. Mahathir took issue with the film splicing images of the Petronas Twin Towers with slums from Malacca. The Malaysian Government had assisted Twentieth Century Fox with visa processing, customs clearance, telecommunications and security in a bid to promote Malaysia as a film location.

References

External links

 
 
 
 
 
 

1999 films
1999 crime thriller films

1990s American films
1990s British films
1990s English-language films
1990s German films
1990s heist films
20th Century Fox films
American crime thriller films
American heist films
British crime thriller films
British heist films
Burglary in film
English-language German films
Fiction featuring the turn of the third millennium
Films directed by Jon Amiel
Films scored by Christopher Young
Films set around New Year
Films set in 1999
Films set in 2000
Films set in Kuala Lumpur
Films set in London
Films set in Malaysia
Films set in Scotland
Films shot at Pinewood Studios
Films shot in Argyll and Bute
Films shot in Buckinghamshire
Films shot in Highland (council area)
Films shot in Kuala Lumpur
Films shot in London
Films shot in Malacca
Films shot in Malaysia
Films shot in New York City
Films shot in Oxfordshire
Films with screenplays by Ronald Bass
German crime thriller films
German heist films
Malay-language films
Regency Enterprises films